Trimurti is a 1995 Indian Hindi-language action drama film starring Jackie Shroff, Anil Kapoor, Shah Rukh Khan, Anjali Jathar and Priya Tendulkar. It was the last completed film for director Mukul S. Anand, who died while filming Dus in 1997. It earned a record opening weekend of around  net, and becoming the "first film to record a  net opening day."

Plot

The notorious Khokha Singh entraps dedicated police inspector Satyadevi Singh (Priya Tendulkar). She has three children Shakti (Jackie Shroff), Anand (Anil Kapoor) and Romi (Shah Rukh Khan), the last of whom was born while she was in jail. They are her Trimurti, who she hopes will assist her in avenging her humiliation. What she doesn't know is that Anand and Shakti had a fight when they were kids. Anand left the house, started working for Peter (One of the Khokha's Blackmarket businessman) and is assumed dead.

After 18 years, Shakti and Romi live together and think their mother is dead. Their uncle tells them she is hoping that the brothers will once again become their mother's Trimurti. Shakti works for the military. Romi is in love with a higher class girl named Radha. They love each other so much that they decide to die when they cannot get married. After pleading with his brother and almost drinking poison, he and Shakti go to Radha's house to ask for her hand, but Shakti is humiliated.

Romi runs away from home and becomes successful. He starts working for Khokha without knowing the issues between Khokha and his mother. Romi meets Sikander, a rich man working in the black market; he feels sympathy for Romi because he is a romantic at heart. He helps Romi become rich.

Sikander goes to Romi's village after hearing some religious music from there. He sees a picture of his mother — who is Shakti and Romi's mother. He slowly tries to rekindle his relationship with Shakti, but once again they have a fight and Shakti learns that he is Anand. After 18 long years, Satyadevi is released from jail due to good behavior. She learns from her brother, Bhanu, that all is not well with her sons. Shakti is an emotional wreck; Anand aka Sikander and Romi are working for Kooka, who has assigned him the task of abducting and killing Satyadevi. In the end, after a lot of hardship, the three brothers come together, kill Khokha Singh, and save their mother.

Cast 

Jackie Shroff as Shakti Singh
Anil Kapoor as Anand Singh / Sikander (dual role)
Shahrukh Khan as Romi Singh / Bholey  (dual role)
Priya Tendulkar as Satyadevi Singh
Gautami Tadimalla as Jyoti 
Anjali Jathar as Radha Chaudhary
Tinnu Anand as Himmat Singh
Saeed Jaffrey as Bhanuwala
Anang Desai as  Satyadevi Singh
Himani Shivpuri as Janki Singh
Satyen Kappu as Sikander's mentor
Mohan Agashe as Khokha Singh
Anirudh Agarwal as Talaf
Sunila Karambelkar as Item Dancer in the Song " Bhikta Hain Sona Mitti ke Bol."

Production
The film began production in early 1994 with a release set for December 1994 and originally the three main lead roles were set to be played by Jackie Shroff, Shahrukh Khan and Sanjay Dutt. Sanjay Dutt had shot some scenes for the film before being sentenced to a prison term. To avoid any delays, producer Subhash Ghai decided to recast his role with Anil Kapoor. The film was eventually completed for release in December 1995. The role of Sanjay Dutt was also offered to Aditya Pancholi and Sunny Deol before Subhash Ghai's frequent collaborator Anil Kapoor got the role.

Music
The film score was composed by Koti while the songs were composed by Laxmikant Pyarelal.

Box office 

India

It opened on Friday, 22 December 1995, across 310 screens, and took a record opening of  net, becoming the first film to record  net on opening day. It grossed  in its opening weekend, and had a first week of {{INRConvert|5.04| and earned a total of  net. It was declared a "Flop" by Box Office India.

Overseas

It earned $375,000 (1.32 crore) outside India.

References

External links

1995 films
1990s Hindi-language films
Films directed by Mukul S. Anand
Films scored by Laxmikant–Pyarelal